Kendriya Vihar, is a housing complex in Kharghar, Navi Mumbai developed by CGEWHO (Central Government Employees Welfare Housing Organisation), an autonomous society of Central Government, which takes care of housing of Central Government employees across India. It is the biggest project of CGEWHO and is one of the best colonies in Navi Mumbai. Mostly central government present and retired employees reside there. It has open space and recreational facilities such as gardens, children play area, etc.

CGEWHO build the Kendriya Vihar complex and sold the flats to central government employees. It covers 19.03 acres of land which is centrally located in Sector 11. It is 15 minutes walking distance from Kharghar Railway Station and one of the first complexes in Kharghar.

It has a federation of six registered societies. There are 1230 flats in Kendriya Vihar: 1, 2, and 3 bhk flats.

Characteristics

Kendriya Vihar comprises four types of apartments like 1-BHK, 2-BHK, 3-BHK and 1-HK.

There are high rise and low rise buildings. The naming convention is 'A' type for 1-BHK, 'B' type for 2-BHK and 'C' type for 3-BHK. High rise buildings are marked as AH, BH and CH.
There is both covered and open parking available for each building.
The society has a community centre which can be used for any social functions. This community centre is rented to residents of Kharghar. There is a grocery shop inside the campus. The society also hosts vegetable mandi inside the campus bi-weekly on every Tuesday and Friday. Many students from surrounding colleges of The Node live here making it a happening place of Kharghar.

Location
Plot No 69, Sector 11, Kharghar, Navi Mumbai 410210

Transportation
Navi Mumbai Municipal Transport (NMMT) services route 26 and 29 from Thane via Belapur, route 57 from Benton via Vashi, route 44 from Dombivali via Turbhe, route 52 from Belapur Railway Station and route 53 and 54 from Kharghar station. Autorickshaw regularly ply between Kendriya Vihar and Kharghar.

BEST bus route 504 from Wadala to Jalvayu Vihar (Kharghar). State Transport (ST) bus from Dadar to Panvel stops at Hiranandani Complex or Kharghar bridge.

Harbour line local train CST to Panvel through Kharghar station. Kendriya Vihar is also near to Proposed International Airport near Panvel.
There is also an upcoming Metro station is opposite to Kendriya Vihar.

External links
NaviMumbai.com - Navi Mumbai Website
Wikimapia.org - Kendriya Vihar Map

Navi Mumbai